The 1973 World Congress of Peace Forces was held in Moscow, Russian SFSR, Soviet Union, October 25-October 31, 1973. At the congress over 3200 delegates from 143 countries, representing more than 1100 political parties, national organizations and movements. Representatives from 123 international organizations took part in the event.

Opening session
The Congress was opened by Seán MacBride, president of the International Peace Bureau and vice chairman of the international preparatory committee of the Congress. Romesh Chandra, the general secretary of the World Peace Council, was elected chair of the Congress.

Other speakers at the opening of the conference were Abdulrahim Abby Farah, representative of the UN Secretary-General Kurt Waldheim, Peter Onu, vice general secretary of the Organisation of African Unity, and Pierre Lebart, representative of the UNESCO Director-General René Maheu.

The main speaker of the event was Leonid Brezhnev, general secretary of the Communist Party of the Soviet Union. His speech was followed by a short intervention by Horace Perera, general secretary of the World Federation of United Nations Associations, who thanked Brezhnev for his contributions for the cause of peace.

Commissions
Fourteen separate commissions, who held parallel meetings during the Congress, were formed. These were:

See also
Peace movement
World Peace Council

References

Peace organizations
World Congress of Peace Forces
Diplomatic conferences in the Soviet Union
1973 conferences
World Peace Council
1973 in Moscow
Peace movement in the Soviet Union
October 1973 events in Europe